The Greatest Hits is a compilation album of songs by the Australian rock band Australian Crawl, taken from their four studio albums (The Boys Light Up, Sirocco, Sons of Beaches and Between a Rock and a Hard Place) and their EP, Semantics.

The Greatest Hits peaked at number 4 on the ARIA Charts and was certified platinum in November 2019. The album was released on vinyl in 2016, with a bonus live track.

Track listing

Charts

Weekly Charts

Year End Charts

Certifications

Release history

References

Australian Crawl albums
Compilation albums by Australian artists
2014 greatest hits albums